is a former Japanese football player.

Playing career
Omoto was born in Kanagawa Prefecture on April 6, 1969. After graduating from Aoyama Gakuin University, he played for his local club Bellmare Hiratsuka. He played as forward for the club until 1996 and he retired end of 1996 season.

Club statistics

References

External links

1969 births
Living people
Aoyama Gakuin University alumni
Association football people from Kanagawa Prefecture
Japanese footballers
J1 League players
Shonan Bellmare players
Association football forwards